Thomas H Boyle was a male badminton player from Ireland.

Profile
Thomas Boyle won the All England Open Badminton Championships, considered as the unofficial World Badminton Championships, in the men's doubles with James Rankin in 1939.

He also won six Irish Open titles.

References 

Irish male badminton players